Rabies immunoglobulin (RIG) is a medication made up of antibodies against the rabies virus. It is used to prevent rabies following exposure. It is given after the wound is cleaned with soap and water or povidone-iodine and is followed by a course of rabies vaccine. It is given by injection into the site of the wound and into a muscle. It is not needed in people who have been previously vaccinated against rabies.

Common side effects include pain at the site of injection, fever, and headache. Severe allergic reactions such as anaphylaxis may rarely occur. Use during pregnancy is not known to harm the baby. It works by binding to the rabies virus before it can enter nerve tissue. After the virus has entered the central nervous system, rabies immunoglobulin is no longer useful.

The use of rabies immunoglobulin in the form of blood serum dates from 1891. Use became common within medicine in the 1950s. It is on the World Health Organization's List of Essential Medicines. Rabies immunoglobulin is expensive and hard to come by in the developing world. In the United States it is estimated to be more than US$1,000.00 per dose. It is made from the blood plasma of people or horses who have high levels of the antibody in their blood. The horse version is less expensive but has a higher rate of side effects.

Medical uses 
Rabies immunoglobulin (RIG) is indicated for the passive, transient post-exposure prophylaxis of rabies infection, when given immediately after contact with a rabid or possibly rabid animal and in combination with a rabies vaccine.

Society and culture

Names 
There are three versions of rabies immunoglobulin licensed and available in the US. Imogam Rabies-HT is produced by Sanofi Pasteur. Kedrab is produced by Kedrion Biopharma. Hyperrab is produced by Grifols.

Imogam Rabies-HT and Kedrab have a nominal potency of 150 IU/mL while Hyperrab has a nominal potency of 300 IU/mL and requires smaller dosing. All three versions are used for post-exposure and indicate local infusion at the wound site with additional amount intramuscularly at a site distant from vaccine administration.

Kamrab is approved for medical use in Australia.

References

Further reading 
 

World Health Organization essential medicines
Wikipedia medicine articles ready to translate